Larger star coral may refer to two different species of coral:

 Favites abdita, a species of coral in the family Merulinidae
 Favites complanata, a species of coral in the family Merulinidae

Set index articles on corals